The discography of the South Korean duo Davichi consists of three studio albums (one of which was re-released), six extended plays, thirty singles, eight collaborations and fourteen soundtrack appearances.

Studio albums

Extended plays

Singles

As featured artist

Collaborations

Other charted songs

Soundtrack appearances

Notes

References

External links
 Davichi's discography on Naver Music

Discographies of South Korean artists
K-pop music group discographies